Red Butte Wilderness is a  wilderness area in the US state of Utah.  It was designated March 30, 2009, as part of the Omnibus Public Land Management Act of 2009.  Located adjacent to Kolob Canyons section of Zion National Park, it encompasses and protects much of the  Red Butte.  Red Butte Wilderness is bordered by the Zion Wilderness to the north.

See also
 List of U.S. Wilderness Areas

References

External links
 Red Butte Wilderness - Wilderness.net
 Map of wilderness areas in northeastern Washington County, Utah

Wilderness areas of Utah
Zion National Park
Protected areas of Washington County, Utah